The 2003 Belgian Supercup was a football match between the winners of the previous season's Belgian First Division and Belgian Cup competitions. The match was contested by Cup winners La Louvière, and 2002–03 Belgian First Division champions, Club Brugge on 2 August 2003 at the ground of the league champions as usual, in this case the Jan Breydel Stadium.

La Louvière took an early lead through Vervalle, with Nastja Čeh providing the equalizer just before the hour mark. Club Brugge eventually won its second consecutive Supercup title and 11th in total, as it beat La Louvière on penalty kicks.

Details

See also
2002–03 Belgian First Division
2002–03 Belgian Cup

References

Belgian Super Cup 2003
R.A.A. Louviéroise
Belgian Super Cup, 2003
Belgian Supercup
Belgian Super Cup 2003
August 2003 sports events in Europe